The New Zealand kākā (Nestor meridionalis) is a large species of parrot of the family Nestoridae found in New Zealand's native forests. The species is often known by the abbreviated name kākā, although it shares this name with the recently extinct Norfolk kākā and Chatham kākā. Two subspecies of New Zealand kākā are recognised. It is endangered and has disappeared from much of its former range, though the re-introduction of North Island kākā at Zealandia in Wellington has led to an increasing population of the birds across the city.

Taxonomy
The New Zealand kākā was formally described in 1788 by the German naturalist Johann Friedrich Gmelin in his revised and expanded edition of Carl Linnaeus's Systema Naturae. He placed it with the parrots in the genus Psittacus and coined the binomial name Psittacus meridionalis. The specific epithet meridionalis is Latin meaning "southern". Gmelin based his description on the "Southern brown parrot" from New Zealand that had been described in 1781 by the English ornithologist John Latham in his book A General Synopsis of Birds. Latham had examined a preserved specimen in the Leverian Museum in London. The New Zealand kākā is now placed in the genus Nestor that was introduced in 1830 by René Lesson.

There are two subspecies, the North Island kākā, Nestor meridionalis septentrionalis, and the South Island kākā, N. m. meridionalis, although more recent research has ruled out allopatric subspeciation. The Māori language name kākā means "parrot", possibly related to kā, 'to screech'.

The genus Nestor contains four species: the New Zealand kākā (Nestor meridionalis), the kea (N. notabilis), the extinct Norfolk kākā (N. productus), and the extinct Chatham kākā (N. chathamensis). All four are thought to stem from a "proto-kākā", dwelling in the forests of New Zealand five million years ago. Their closest relative is the kākāpō (Strigops habroptilus). Together, they form the parrot superfamily Strigopoidea, an ancient group that split off from all other Psittaciformes before their radiation.

Description

It is closely related to the kea, but has darker plumage and is more arboreal. The forehead and crown are greyish-white and the nape is greyish brown. The neck and abdomen are more reddish, while the wings are more brownish. Both sub-species have a strongly patterned brown/green/grey plumage with orange and scarlet flashes under the wings; colour variants that show red to yellow colouration especially on the breast are sometimes found.

The calls include a harsh ka-aa and a whistling u-wiia.

Distribution and habitat
The New Zealand kākā lives in lowland and mid-altitude native forest. Its strongholds are currently the offshore reserves of Kapiti Island, Codfish Island and Little Barrier Island. It is breeding rapidly in the mainland island sanctuary at Zealandia with over 800 birds banded since their reintroduction in 2002. From their reintroduction in 2002, North Island kākā continue to re-colonise Wellington and a 2015 report showed a significant increase in their numbers over the preceding 12 years.

South Island Kākā 
New Zealand kākā are still considered common and easy to find in certain large forested areas of the South Island. Kākā can be found in Rotoiti Nature Recovery Project, along the Milford Track and in the Eglinton Valley in Fiordland National Park

New Zealand kākā can also be found around Stewart Island and the offshore Islands of Whenua Hou and Ulva Island.

In 2015 project Janszoon first released New Zealand kākā into Abel Tasman National Park with an additional release in 2019.

Behaviour

New Zealand kākā are mainly arboreal and occupy mid-to-high canopy. They are often seen flying across valleys or calling from the top of emergent trees. They are very gregarious and move in large flocks that often include kea, where they are present. They are highly active at dawn and dusk and can sometimes be heard calling loudly even at 3:00 am.

Breeding
The New Zealand kākā nests in cavities in hollow trees. The entrance hole is often three to six metres above the ground, but can be as low as ground level on predator-free offshore islands. The nest floor is lined with small wood chips and powder. They lay eggs any time between September (late winter) and March (summer). Occasionally, in a good fruiting year, a pair can double clutch, often utilising the same nest hole for the second clutch and extending breeding into winter. They typically lay four eggs, though it can be up to eight, with two chicks fledging. Only the female incubates the eggs, for about 24 days, and cares for the nestlings, but she is regularly fed by the male throughout breeding. Both parents feed the chicks after they have fledged.

Feeding

New Zealand kākā typically eat fruits, berries, seeds, flowers, buds, nectar, sap, plants and invertebrates. They use their strong beak to shred the cones of the kauri tree to obtain the seeds. It has a brush tongue with which it feeds on nectar, and it uses its strong beak to dig out the grubs of the huhu beetle and to remove bark to feed on sap.

Conservation status
New Zealand kākā are considered vulnerable, having greatly declined across their traditional range as a result of habitat loss, predation by introduced predators such as cats, rats, possums and stoats, and competition from wasps and bees for the honeydew excreted by scale insects. A closely related species, Nestor productus, the Norfolk kākā, became extinct in 1851 for similar reasons. New Zealand kākā are absolutely protected under New Zealand's Wildlife Act 1953. The species is also listed under Appendix II of the Convention on International Trade in Endangered Species of Wild Fauna and Flora (CITES) meaning international export/import (including parts and derivatives) is regulated.

Predation
As cavity nesters with a long incubation period that requires the mother to stay on the nest for at least 90 days, New Zealand kākā are particularly vulnerable to predation. Stoats were the main cause of death of nesting adult females, nestlings and fledglings, but possums were also important predators of adult females, eggs and nestlings. There is strong evidence that predation of chicks and females has led to a serious age and sex imbalance, even amongst ostensibly healthy populations.

In parts of the country, the Department of Conservation and local conservation groups have attempted to control predators of New Zealand kākā through the use of traps, ground baiting and the aerial deployment of sodium fluoroacetate (1080). Where pest control has been carried out, there has been a significant recovery of New Zealand kākā populations. For example, in Pureora Forest Park 20 kākā were radio-tracked in an area to be treated with aerial 1080 in 2001. In nearby Waimanoa Forest, which was not to be treated with 1080, nine kākā were radio-tracked. In the area where 1080 was used, all 20 birds survived that season. Of the nine birds tagged in the untreated area, five were killed by predators that same season.

Competition

Research has shown that honeydew is very important for breeding New Zealand kākā, especially for those breeding in southern beech forests. The difficult nature of controlling the wasps makes the future of the New Zealand kākā very uncertain.

Human interaction 
Re-introduction of North Island kākā at Zealandia in Wellington, combined with conservation efforts, has led to a large increase in the population of the birds in the city.  Many kākā visit residential gardens and reserves, and this in turn has led to more interactions with people. People have been feeding the birds unsuitable food such as nuts, various grains and cheese. Feeding kākā has resulted in metabolic bone disease in kākā chicks. In 2016 80% of the kākā chicks being monitored by the Wellington City Council died from this disease. There have also been instances of kākā nesting in the roofs of houses.

References

Further reading
Kaka 'back from the brink' after Fiordland 1080 operation takes out predators Department of Conservation website 28 April 2011
1080 drop boosts Waitutu kaka Southland Times website 27 April 2011
Pureora Forest kaka demonstrate benefits of using 1080 poison Waikato Regional Council website
kaka and 1080 poison 1080: The Facts website (a public education initiative by Forest and Bird and Federated Farmers)
Effects of a 1080 operation on kaka and kereru survival and nesting success, Whirinaki Forest Park, Powlesland et al.  (PDF, 400kb) New Zealand Journal of Ecology (2003) 27(2): 125–137
Effect of controlling introduced predators on kaka in Rotoiti Nature Recovery Project Published on the Department of Conservation website, April 2011
Project Kaka – a joint Department of Conservation and Animal Health Board initiative to restore kaka to the Tararua ranges
Possum-killing poison helps protect New Zealand parrot Scientific American website

External links

New Zealand Birds Online website
World Parrot Trust Parrot Encyclopedia – Species Profiles
 BirdLife Species Factsheet.
 Kākā (New Zealand Department of Conservation)
 KakaWatchNZ website – A site dedicated to kākā distribution in the upper North Island of New Zealand
 Kaka on NZ Birds website www.NZbirds.com

Kākā
Kākā
Kākā
Kākā